Giandomenico Mesto  (born 25 May 1982) is a former Italian footballer. Known for his pace, work-rate, and versatility, Mesto usually played as a full-back or as a wide midfielder on the right flank.

Club career
After making his professional debut during the 1998–99 Serie B season, Mesto has spent the majority of his career at Reggina, aside from spells with Cremonese and Fermana during the 2001–02 Serie C2 and C1 seasons, makine 138 appearances and scoring 1 goal; he was loaned out to Udinese during the 2007–08 season. In 2008, he transferred to Genoa, where he remained for four seasons. In 2012, he moved to Napoli where he remained until the 2014–15 Serie A season, winning a Coppa Italia and the Supercoppa Italiana in 2014. At the end of the season, his contract was not renewed. On 31 December 2015 he signed with Greek side Panathinaikos for one and a half years. On 1 June 2016, Mesto extended his contract with the club for another year till the summer of 2018.

International career
At international level, Mesto appeared in the Italian under-21 national team which won the 2004 UEFA European Under-21 Championship, and was a member of the under-23's Olympic squad which won the bronze medal at the 2004 Summer Olympics in Athens. Afterwards, he made his senior international debut for Italy a year later, in a 1–1 friendly draw against Serbia and Montenegro, on 8 June 2005; in total, he has obtained three caps for Italy.

Honours

International
Italy U21
UEFA European Under-21 Championship: 2004
Olympic Bronze Medal: 2004

Club
Napoli
Coppa Italia: 2013–14
Supercoppa Italiana: 2014

Orders
 5th Class / Knight: Cavaliere Ordine al Merito della Repubblica Italiana: 2004

References

External links
 
 
 

1982 births
Living people
People from Monopoli
Footballers at the 2004 Summer Olympics
Italian footballers
Italy international footballers
Italy under-21 international footballers
Italy youth international footballers
Olympic bronze medalists for Italy
Olympic footballers of Italy
Serie A players
Serie B players
Super League Greece players
Reggina 1914 players
Fermana F.C. players
U.S. Cremonese players
Udinese Calcio players
Genoa C.F.C. players
S.S.C. Napoli players
Panathinaikos F.C. players
Olympic medalists in football
Medalists at the 2004 Summer Olympics
Italian expatriate footballers
Expatriate footballers in Greece
Association football midfielders
Association football defenders
Knights of the Order of Merit of the Italian Republic
Footballers from Apulia
Sportspeople from the Metropolitan City of Bari